Harald August Bohr (22 April 1887 – 22 January 1951) was a Danish mathematician and footballer. After receiving his doctorate in 1910, Bohr became an eminent mathematician, founding the field of almost periodic functions. His brother was the Nobel Prize-winning physicist Niels Bohr. He was a member of the Danish national football team for the 1908 Summer Olympics, where he won a silver medal.

Biography
Bohr was born in 1887 to Christian Bohr, a professor of physiology, from a Lutheran background, and Ellen Adler Bohr, a woman from a wealthy Jewish family of local renown. Harald had a close relationship with his elder brother, which The Times likened to that between Captain Cuttle and Captain Bunsby in Charles Dickens' Dombey and Son.

Mathematical career
Like his father and brother before him, in 1904 Bohr enrolled at the University of Copenhagen, where he studied mathematics, obtaining his master's degree in 1909 and his doctorate a year later. Among his tutors were Hieronymus Georg Zeuthen and Thorvald N. Thiele. Bohr worked in mathematical analysis; much of his early work was devoted to Dirichlet series including his doctorate, which was entitled Bidrag til de Dirichletske Rækkers Theori (Contributions to the Theory of Dirichlet Series). A collaboration with Göttingen-based Edmund Landau resulted in the Bohr–Landau theorem, regarding the distribution of zeroes in zeta functions.

Bohr worked in mathematical analysis, founding the field of almost periodic functions, and worked with the Cambridge mathematician G. H. Hardy.

In 1915 he became a professor at Polyteknisk Læreanstalt (today Technical University of Denmark), working there until 1930, when he took a professorship at the University of Copenhagen. He remained in this post for 21 years until his death in 1951. Børge Jessen was one of his students there.

He was a visiting professor at Stanford University during the academic year 1930–1931. He was a visiting scholar at the Institute for Advanced Study in the summer of 1948.

In the 1930s Bohr was a leading critic of the anti-Semitic policies taking root in the German mathematical establishment, publishing an article criticising Ludwig Bieberbach's ideas in Berlingske Aften in 1934.

Football

Bohr was also an excellent football player. He had a long playing career with Akademisk Boldklub, making his debut as a 16-year-old in 1903. During the 1905 season he played alongside his brother Niels, who was a goalkeeper. Harald was selected to play for the Danish national team in the 1908 Summer Olympics, where football was an official event for the first time. Though a Danish side had played at the 1906 Intercalated Games, the opening match of the 1908 Olympic tournament was Denmark's first official international football match. Bohr scored two goals as Denmark beat the French "B" team 9–0. In the next match, the semi-final, Bohr played in a 17–1 win against France, which remains an Olympic record. Denmark faced hosts Great Britain in the final, but lost 2–0, and Bohr won a silver medal. After the Olympics he made one further appearance for the national team, in a 2–1 victory against an England amateur team in 1910. His popularity as a footballer was such that when he defended his doctoral thesis the audience was reported as having more football fans than mathematicians.

Teacher
Bohr was known as an extremely capable academic teacher and the annual award for outstanding teaching at the University of Copenhagen is called the Harald, in honour of Harald Bohr. With Johannes Mollerup, Bohr wrote an influential four-volume textbook Lærebog i Matematisk Analyse (Textbook in mathematical analysis).

Kaj Munk 
Following the murder of Kaj Munk on 4 January 1944 the Danish resistance newspaper De frie Danske brought condemning reactions from influential Scandinavians, including Bohr.

See also
 Bohr–Mollerup theorem
 Bohr compactification
 Bohr–Favard inequality
 Danish Mathematical Society
 List of select Jewish football (association; soccer) players

References

External links
 
 Danish national team profile
 Some photos of Harald Bohr
 

1887 births
1951 deaths
20th-century Danish mathematicians
Institute for Advanced Study visiting scholars
Danish men's footballers
Olympic footballers of Denmark
Olympic silver medalists for Denmark
Footballers at the 1908 Summer Olympics
Denmark international footballers
Akademisk Boldklub players
Harald
Olympic medalists in football
Danish Jews
Danish people of Jewish descent
Medalists at the 1908 Summer Olympics
Association football midfielders
Jewish footballers
Members of the Göttingen Academy of Sciences and Humanities
Members of the Royal Swedish Academy of Sciences